Pseudidactus roggemani is a species of beetle in the family Cerambycidae, and the only species in the genus Pseudidactus. It was described by Breuning in 1977.

References

Ancylonotini
Beetles described in 1977
Monotypic beetle genera